Khar Lake (lit. "black lake") is located in the Zavkhan aimag (province) in western Mongolia. Khar Lake occupies a  dale in the Khangai Mountains to the East from the Great Lakes Depression.

External links
 Har Nuur at NASA Earth Observatory

Lakes of Mongolia